The Justice and Equality Movement (JEM;) is an opposition group in Sudan founded by Khalil Ibrahim. Gibril Ibrahim has led the group since January 2012 after the death of Khalil, his brother, in December 2011. JEM's political agenda includes issues such as: radical and comprehensive constitutional reform to grant Sudan's regions a greater share of power in ruling the country (one point of this is a rotating presidency), the replacement of social injustice and political tyranny with justice and equality, and basic services for every Sudanese.

Formation and organization

The beginnings of the Justice and Equality Movement trace to the writers of the Black Book, a manuscript published in 2000 that details what it views as the structural inequality in the country; the JEM founder, Khalil Ibrahim, was one of the authors. JEM advocates replacing the dictatorship of Omar al-Bashir and the ruling Congress Party with a civil, democratic state that respects the rights of Sudan's various ethnic groups, women, and youth. The JEM further committed itself to these principles when it signed the New Dawn Charter in January 2013.

JEM claim to possesses forces numbering around 35,000 and an ethnically diverse membership. According to critics it is not the "rainbow of tribes" it claims to be, as most JEM members, including its leader, are from the Zaghawa tribe. JEM is part of the Sudan Revolutionary Front (SRF), an alliance of groups opposed to the government in Khartoum that include the Sudan Liberation Movement(Abdul Wahed), the Sudan Liberation Movement (Minnawi), and the Sudan Liberation Movement - North.

History of attacks

Raids on Haskanita
In the September and October 2007 raids on Haskanita JEM units attacked the African Union Mission in Sudan. Three JEM leaders, Bahr Idriss Abu Garda, Abdallah Banda Abakaer Nourain and Saleh Mohammed Jerbo Jamus, were charged by the International Criminal Court (ICC) of war crimes. The case against Garda was dropped due to lack of evidence and the case against Jerbo was dropped after his presumed death on 19 April 2013. , Banda was considered a fugitive by the ICC.

Oilfield attacks and anti-government operations
In October 2007, the JEM attacked the Defra oilfield in the Kordofan region of Sudan. The Greater Nile Petroleum Operating Company, a Chinese-led consortium, controls the field. The next month, a group of 135 Chinese engineers arrived in Darfur to work on the Defra field. Ibrahim told reporters, "We oppose them coming because the Chinese are not interested in human rights. [They are] just interested in Sudan's resources." The JEM claims that the revenue from oil sold to China funds the Sudanese government and the Janjaweed militia.

On the morning of December 11, 2007, Khalil Ibrahim claimed that JEM forces fought and defeated Sudanese government troops guarding a Chinese-run oilfield in the Kordofan region. Khartoum officials, however, denied that any oil fields had come under attack.  Ibrahim said that the attack was part of a JEM campaign to rid Sudan of Chinese-run oilfields and stated that "[The JEM] want all Chinese companies to leave. They have been warned many times. They should not be there."

2008–2013 Khartoum attack and continued battles
In May 2008, JEM engaged in its most famous operation against the Sudanese government when it attacked the Sudanese capital of Khartoum. The operation ended with heavy battles in the western part of the Sudanese capital that included the government's use of army helicopters to repel the JEM advance. Following this battle, Eltahir Elfaki, the General Secretary of JEM's legislative council, vowed that the war would henceforth be fought across the country, saying that "We haven't changed our tactics. From the beginning, Jem is a national movement and it has a national agenda." Khalil Ibrahim declared that "This is just the start of a process and the end is the termination of this regime".

In April 2013, JEM and its allies in the Sudan Revolutionary Front engaged in many successful attacks against Sudanese government forces. As part of the offensive, JEM and the SRF also gained control of Abu Korshola, a strategic town of 40,000 in  South Kordofan. In its bid to retake control, the Sudanese Armed Forces engaged in indiscriminate air raid campaigns. On May 27, the opposition forces withdrew in order to allow humanitarian aid to be delivered to the area's residents. During 2013, opposition forces continued to engage in offensive operations, leading to dozens of casualties for Sudanese forces around Abu Korshola.

August 2020 peace agreement
The Justice and Equality Movement signed a peace agreement with the Transitional Government of Sudan on 31 August 2020 and will now participate in the transition to democracy in Sudan through peaceful means. Under the terms of the agreement, the factions that signed will be entitled to three seats on the sovereignty council, a total of five ministers in the transitional cabinet and a quarter of seats in the transitional legislature. At a regional level, signatories will be entitled between 30 and 40% of the seats on transitional legislatures of their home states or regions.

Notes and references

External links
Justice and Equality Movement (JEM Sudan) The JEM's English Language homepage
Photojournalist's Account - Images of the Justice and Equality Movement and Darfur's displaced
Darfur conflict
 - Greater Nile Petroleum Operating Company's website.

Guerrilla organizations
Politics of Sudan
War in Darfur
Islamic organisations based in Sudan
Rebel groups in Sudan
Rebel groups in Chad
Sudan Revolutionary Front